Diana Patrícia Silveira da Piedade (born 22 April 1985 - Lagos, Portugal) is a Portuguese rock singer and songwriter.

In February 2010, Diana finished as the runner-up in 2009 season 3 of Ídolos, the Portuguese version of Pop Idol.

Biography 
With a powerful raspy and soulful voice, this charismatic rock figure was considered in 2010 one of Portugal’s upcoming voices.

Between the ages of 15 and 19, Diana Silveira began her career as a professional singer. First with the band "Duck," and later with "Fadomorse," she recorded songs such as "Funk my Funk" from Duck and "Deicídio" from Fadomorse along with a special guest Adolfo Luxúria Canibal from a Portuguese cult band Mão Morta.

In 2004, she took part of the first cast of the Musical Theatre "Cabeças no Ar" written by author Carlos Té and directed by Adriano Luz at the "Teatro Municipal de Lisboa, S. Luiz".

Throughout her living period in Paris (2006/2009), she did backing vocals for a Pink Floyd Tribute Band.

During her participation on the TV Show "Idols" (2009/2010), her music career gets to a higher level.

Reaching an incredible number of fans on her Facebook page in just about 4 months, with her 173.000 "Likes" scattered all over the planet that the phenomenon reaches a gigantic proportion. ("Diana Piedade Idolos" FB page, is now offline. You can find her Official Facebook Page at )

The recognition of her talent also happens through various online pages, one of them being Janis Joplin's (janisjoplin.net), after her interpretation of the "Piece of my heart" song.

Considered by the media as "Best New Artist" in 2010, the charismatic figure and voice of Diana takes her to the world's biggest music festival, Rock in Rio in Lisbon. And is with the all-star band HAIL! That Diana assumes her Heavy-Metal vein, alongside Andreas Kisser (Sepultura), Ripper Owens [YNGWIE MALMSTEEN and ex-JUDAS PRIEST], Paul Bostaph (Slayer, Testament, Exodus) and James Lomezo (White Lion and Black Label Society, Megadeth).

Between May and September 2010, the National Tour "Rock ON Diana" was a success. Along with Ivo Perpétuo, Vasco Moura, Hugo Palma, Ademar Alves and Bruno Victor Martins, the adventure took place and led to the creation of a music project called 3:33 that would end in 2012 after one EP ("EUFÊMEA") and another tour all over the country.

Among some advertising works like the biggest campaign of SONAE calendar ("Popota e o Natal", 2010/2012) and pro-Bono participations as well as solidarity events, the voice of Diana Silveira also became part of a big YouTube hit "Margem Sul State of Mind" with Rui Unas, a satire on the everyday life of some Portuguese people based on the music "New York State of Mind" from Jay-Z and Alicia Keys.

In 2011 she made a special appearance on the soundtrack of the award-winning short film "TEJO" of Francisco Baptista and Henrique Pina.

In 2011 Diana also met Gary Lucas, an American guitarist and Grammy-nominated songwriter. One of the great names in the world of music and known developer of Jeff Buckley, Captain Beefheart among many others. Diana was invited to participate in a concert tribute to Jeff Buckley at the Knitting Factory concert house in New York, where she received very positive recognition by the New York's music scene critics.

In January 2012, she was invited once again by Gary Lucas to perform, now in Portugal, at Galeria Zé dos Bois in Lisbon and Plan B, Oporto.

In October 2013, the book Touched by Grace--My Time with Jeff Buckley by Gary Lucas was edited by Jawbone and Diana appeared in the book alongside the American guitarists as part of his story with Jeff Buckley.

Later in November 2013, Diana flew to London to be part of the official release of the book, performing at the Southbank Center on the 14th Nov with Gary Lucas, Najma Akhtar, Mari Conti and Frances Brennand Roper.

In 2015, she attempted to represent Portugal at the Eurovision Song Contest with the song "Maldito Tempo". However, she was not selected and ended up finishing fourth place on her semifinal at the portuguese preselection, named Festival da Canção.

Idols
Diana auditioned for the third season of Ídolos in Lisbon. She eventually became the runner-up.

Curiosities 
After her version of the Janis Joplin song, the video became part of a Joplin's tribute website, janisjoplin.net, becoming the first artist ever to have a video of her own on this website, besides Joplin.

Also, after her performance on Led Zeppelin's "Whole Lotta Love", Diana made it again to a main site of dedicated fans. This time was the site led-zeppelin.org - Achilles Last Stand (online since 1996), the biggest fan site of the band, that referred her performance.

According to the jury of the contest, her version of "E Depois do Adeus" was the best performance in all the seasons of Portuguese Idols until the date.

During summer, the singer gave many concerts in her own name, performing with a live band "Les Miserables", composed by Ivo Perpétuo on guitar, Vasco Moura on bass, Hugo Palma on drums and also the special guest, guitarist Tuniko Goulart. During the performances were explored various styles from rock to the blues, from Jimi Hendrix to Queens of the Stone Age.

References

21st-century Portuguese women singers
1985 births
Living people
Idols (franchise) participants